For other uses: Mahavelona (disambiguation)

Mahavelona (Ankozobe)  is a town in Analamanga Region, in the  Central Highlands of Madagascar, located north-west from the capital of Antananarivo. The population is 16,028 by 2018.

References

Populated places in Analamanga